The Galt House Hotel is a 25-story, 1,300-room hotel in Louisville, Kentucky, established in 1972.  It is named for a nearby historic hotel erected in 1835 and demolished in 1921. The Galt House is the city's only hotel on the Ohio River.

Original Galt House

The Galt House was, in the early 19th century, the residence of Dr. William Craig Galt.  The house was located at the corner of Second and Main Street.

The first Galt House was opened by Col. Ariss Throckmorton in 1835. It was a 60-room hotel on the northeast corner of Second and Main streets.  During the nineteenth century, The Galt House was acclaimed as Louisville's best hotel. Many noted people stayed at the original Galt House, including Jefferson Davis, Charles Dickens, Abraham Lincoln and Ulysses S. Grant.

During the Civil War, the Galt House was utilized for meetings of Union generals. In September 1862, it was the scene of an unusual murder, when General Jefferson C. Davis (not to be confused with Confederate President Jefferson Davis) shot Union General William "Bull" Nelson after a dispute.

According to a historical marker for the original Galt House, in March 1864, Generals Ulysses S. Grant and William Tecumseh Sherman met at the Galt House to plan the invasion that led to the successful capture of Atlanta, Georgia, and Sherman's March to the Sea.  As of 2014, this claim has fallen into dispute.

The first Galt House structure burned down in 1865. Four years later, in 1869, a larger Galt House was established nearby, on the corner of First and Main streets.  Known as the center of Louisville's social life during this time, the hotel closed in 1919 due to financial difficulties and was demolished in 1921 to be replaced by a new headquarters building for the Belknap Hardware and Manufacturing Company, now known as the Waterside Building.

Current Galt House

Over a half a century later, in 1972, the Galt House Hotel was re-established by developer Al J. Schneider as part of Louisville's Riverfront Urban Renewal Project.  The West Tower is 25 stories high and features 130,000 square feet of meeting space, deluxe guest rooms, corner suites, and six restaurants - Walker's Exchange, Jockey Silks Bourbon Bar, Down One Bourbon Bar, Al J's, Thelma's, and Swizzle Dinner & Drinks restaurant on the 25th Floor opening in Spring 2020.  An East Tower was added in 1984.  It offers 650 suites, including waterfront balcony suites and waterfront apartments.  With 1310 guest rooms, the Galt House Hotel is the largest in Kentucky. It has 130,000 square feet of meeting space, including more than 50 meeting rooms, two ballrooms and an exhibit hall. Other amenities include a fitness center on the top floor of the East Tower, a business and shipping center, a spa and salon, a barbershop, retail shops, and Down One Bourbon Bar.  The East and West Towers are connected by a three-story glass enclosed Conservatory, which features Thelma's Deli (named for founder Al J. Schneider's wife, Thelma French Schneider), Al J's Lounge, and indoor seating.

The Galt House Hotel is the Official Hotel of Churchill Downs, the Kentucky Derby, the Kentucky Oaks, the Kentucky Derby Festival, Thunder Over Louisville, and the KFC Yum! Center.

On August 21, 2019, U.S. President Donald Trump visited the Galt House to deliver the keynote address at AMVETS 75th National Convention. At the end of the speech the president signed a presidential memorandum, directing the United States Department of Education to forgive all student debt incurred by disabled military veterans.

See also
Brown Hotel
History of Louisville, Kentucky
List of attractions and events in the Louisville metropolitan area
Louisville in the American Civil War
Riverfront Plaza/Belvedere
Seelbach Hotel

References

Domine, David. Insiders' Guide to Louisville. Guilford, CT: Globe-Pequot Press, 2010. .

External links
Galt House web site
 More about the renovation

Skyscraper hotels in Kentucky
Hotels established in 1972
Hotel buildings completed in 1972
Buildings and structures with revolving restaurants
Tourist attractions in Kentucky
Skyscrapers in Louisville, Kentucky
Kentucky in the American Civil War
Louisville, Kentucky, in the American Civil War
American Civil War sites
Ohio River
Hotels established in 1835